The Seri Andalas LRT station is a light rapid transit (LRT) station that serves the suburb of Klang in Selangor, Malaysia. The station is an elevated rapid transit station in Taman Sri Andalas, Klang, Selangor, Malaysia, forming part of the Klang Valley Integrated Transit System and serves as one of the stations on the Shah Alam line

The station is marked as Station No. 22 along the RM9 billion line project with the line's maintenance depot located in Johan Setia, Klang. The Sri Andalas LRT station is expected to be operational in February 2024 and will have facilities such as Park and Ride, kiosks, restrooms, elevators, taxi stand and feeder bus among others.

Locality landmarks
 Hospital Tengku Ampuan Rahimah Klang (HTAR)
 Hospital Bersalin Razif
 Taman Sri Andalas
 Batu Unjur
 Taman Bayu Tinggi
 Taman Bayu Perdana
 Taman Chi Liung
 Pandamaran
 Taman Rakyat

References

External links
 LRT3 Bandar Utama–Klang line

Rapid transit stations in Selangor
Shah Alam Line